Colour is the second album by British soul group The Christians. It was released in January 1990 by Island Records and peaked at number one on the UK Albums Chart. It also reached the Top 20 in several European countries due, notably, to the success of its lead single "Words".

Track listing
All songs written and composed by Henry Priestman except where noted.
 "Man Don't Cry" – 4:45
 "I Found Out" – 4:30
 "Greenbank Drive" – 4:24
 "All Talk" – 4:38
 "Words" (music: traditional, arranged Priestman, lyrics: Priestman) – 7:04
 "Community of Spirit" (Garry Christian) – 5:13
 "There You Go Again" – 6:01
 "One More Baby in Black" – 5:39
 "In My Hour of Need" – 6:23

2012 reissue bonus tracks
<li>"Long Gone" – 3:20
<li>"Funny Money" – 3:35
<li>"Save Us from Our Friends" – 3:46
<li>"Sent Here to Shine" – 4:29
<li>"Greenback Drive" (Laurie Latham Remix) – 4:28
<li>"From the Water's Edge" – 3:24
<li>"Greenback Drive" (Nomad Soul 7") – 4:45

Personnel
The Christians:
 Garry A. Christian – Lead Vocals
 Russell Christian – Saxophone, Vocals
 Henry Priestman – Keyboards, Guitar, Vocals
 Steve Ferrone – Drums
 Manu Katche – Drums
 Pino Palladino – Fretless Bass

Additional personnel:
 The London Community Gospel Choir – choir on "In My Hour of Need"

Chart performance

References

1990 albums
The Christians (band) albums